This is an incomplete list of people who have served as Custos Rotulorum of Lancashire.

 Bartilmew Hesketh c.1535
 Sir John Holcroft 1547–1560
 Sir Richard Molyneux, 1st Baronet by 1598–1623
 Sir Richard Molyneux by 1627–1630
 James Stanley, 7th Earl of Derby by 1636
 Interregnum 1646–1660
 Richard Kirkby 1664–1681
 Caryll Molyneux, 3rd Viscount Molyneux c.1685–1689
 Hon Charles Gerard 1689–1701
 James Stanley, 10th Earl of Derby 1702–1710
 James Hamilton, 4th Duke of Hamilton 1710–1712
 vacant
 James Stanley, 10th Earl of Derby 1714–1736

The office was permanently joined with that of Lord Lieutenant of Lancashire before 1834.

Lancashire
History of Lancashire
Lancashire-related lists